Luigi Sorrentino (born 30 January 1991 in Naples) is an Italian goalkeeper who currently plays for S.S. Scafatese Calcio 1922.

Career

Scafatese
In September 2019 it was confirmed, that Sorrentino had joined Italian club S.S. Scafatese Calcio 1922.

References

External links

1991 births
Living people
Footballers from Naples
Italian footballers
A.C. Monza players
Giulianova Calcio players
Olbia Calcio 1905 players
Serie C players
Serie D players
Association football goalkeepers